Waynesboro High School is a public high school in Waynesboro, Virginia, United States. Construction on the school began in 1936, funded by a Public Works Administration grant. Soon after it was completed in April 1938, there were 370 students and 13 faculty members.  

In the spring of 2015, there was an ongoing debate on the future of the building: to rebuild or renovate. As of 2018, construction began for the renovation and the new additions to Waynesboro High School.

Notable alumni
 Kenny Brooks, Virginia Tech women's head basketball coach 
 Cory Alexander, former professional basketball player
 Ann Bedsole (b. 1930), first woman elected to the Alabama Senate
 Reggie Harris, former MLB player (Oakland Athletics, Boston Red Sox, Philadelphia Phillies, Houston Astros, Milwaukee Brewers)

References

External links 
 Waynesboro High School

Public high schools in Virginia
Waynesboro, Virginia